The 55th Baeksang Arts Awards ceremony, organised by Ilgan Sports and JTBC Plus, took place on May 1, 2019, at Hall D, COEX, Seoul, beginning at 9:00 p.m. KST. It was hosted by Shin Dong-yup, Bae Suzy and Park Bo-gum for the second consecutive year and was broadcast live on JTBC. One of South Korea's major awards shows, the annual awards ceremony recognizes excellence in film and television. 

The highest honors of the night, Grand Prize (Daesang), were awarded to actor Jung Woo-sung of Innocent Witness in the film division and actress Kim Hye-ja of The Light in Your Eyes in the television division.

Winners and nominees 

Winners are listed first, highlighted in boldface, and indicated with a double dagger.
Nominees

Film

Films with multiple wins 
The following films received multiple wins:

Films with multiple nominations 
The following films received multiple nominations:

Television

Programs with multiple wins 
The following television programs received multiple wins:

Programs with multiple nominations 
The following television programs received multiple nominations:

Special awards

Performers 
Performers listed in the order of appearance.

References

External links 
  
 

Baeksang
Baeksang
Baeksang Arts Awards
Baek
Baek
2010s in Seoul
2019 in South Korea